Arthur Jacob Herchenratter (November 24, 1917 — August 1, 1989) was a Canadian ice hockey player who played 10 games in the National Hockey League with the Detroit Red Wings during the 1940–41 season. The rest of his career, which lasted from 1938 to 1950, was spent in various minor leagues.

Career statistics

Regular season and playoffs

External links

1917 births
1989 deaths
Canadian ice hockey right wingers
Detroit Red Wings players
Houston Huskies players
Ice hockey people from Ontario
Indianapolis Capitals players
Kitchener Greenshirts players
New Haven Eagles players
Omaha Knights (AHA) players
Ontario Hockey Association Senior A League (1890–1979) players
Sportspeople from Kitchener, Ontario
Springfield Indians players